Mount Frere, officially KwaBhaca, is a town located in the Eastern Cape province, previously known as the Transkei region, of South Africa. Its name in Xhosa is KwaBhaca, or "village of the Bhaca chiefdom", or "place of the Bhaca people", who settled here around the year 1825. 

KwaBhaca is situated between Kokstad and Mthatha along the N2 road about 100 km north east of Mthatha. It is administered by the Alfred Nzo District Municipality and the villages are ruled by the Tribal chief with intermediary borders.

Mount Frere was founded in the 17th century and named after Sir Henry Bartle Edward Frere. In February 2016, Mount Frere was renamed KwaBhaca.

References

External links
Bhaca| AmaBhaca

Populated places in the Umzimvubu Local Municipality